The Painter's Family is an oil painting in the Flemish Baroque style by painter Jacob Jordaens. It was completed in 1621-1622. The painting depicts the artist with his wife, Catharina van Noort, and their first child, Elizabeth. The woman behind them is likely a servant due to her attire and position in the painting. It is currently on display at the Museo del Prado.

References

1622 paintings
Paintings by Jacob Jordaens
Oil paintings
Flemish Baroque paintings
Paintings of the Museo del Prado by Flemish artists